
Year 414 BC was a year of the pre-Julian Roman calendar. At the time, it was known as the Year of the Tribunate of Cossus, Ambustus, Potitus and Albinus (or, less frequently, year 340 Ab urbe condita). The denomination 414 BC for this year has been used since the early medieval period, when the Anno Domini calendar era became the prevalent method in Europe for naming years.

Events 
 By place 

 Greece 
 Athens responds to appeals from its general, Nicias, by sending out 73 vessels to Sicily under the command of Demosthenes to assist Nicias and his forces with the siege of Syracuse.
 The Athenian army moves to capture Syracuse while the larger fleet of Athenian ships blocks the approach to the city from the sea. After some initial success, the Athenian troops become disorganised in the chaotic night operation and are thoroughly routed by Gylippus, the Spartan commander. The Athenian commander Lamachus is killed. Nicias, although ill, is left in sole charge of the siege of Syracuse.

 By topic 

 Drama 
 Aristophanes' play The Birds is performed.

Births

Deaths 
 Lamachus, Athenian general

References